The Juniata Valley Railroad  is a short line that operates 11 miles of track in Mifflin County, Pennsylvania in the United States. It is part of the North Shore Railroad System.

The communities served include Lewistown (and the MCIDC industrial park), the unincorporated village of Maitland in Derry Township, and Burnham.  All the track meets at Lewistown, with lines to the industrial park to the southwest, Maitland to the northeast (roughly parallel to U.S. Route 522), and Burnham to the northwest (roughly parallel to U.S. Route 322). 

The system has trackage rights via the Norfolk Southern Railway, which it connects to at Lewistown.

History
The line operated by the Juniata Valley Railroad was a Penn Central Railroad line that was taken over by Conrail. SEDA-COG JRA (Susquehanna Economic Development Association - Council of Governments Joint Rail Authority)  was formed in July, 1983 to continue to provide rail service to communities whose rail lines Conrail had decided to abandon. In 1996 the JRA took over the line when Conrail abandoned it, and the Juniata Valley Railroad was born as its fourth railroad.

See also
List of Pennsylvania railroads
Stourbridge Railroad (also operated by Robey Railroads)

External links

 Juniata Valley Railroad

Pennsylvania railroads
Railway lines opened in 1996
Spin-offs of Conrail
Transportation in Mifflin County, Pennsylvania